Hofplein is a major public town square in Rotterdam, the Netherlands. The square lies on a crossing of the Weena, the Schiekade and the Coolsingel. In the center of the square a large fountain is situated.

Near the square lay the former Rotterdam Hofplein railway station.

References

External links

Squares in the Netherlands
Geography of Rotterdam